Ethan R. Ringel (born August 12, 1994 in Windermere, Florida, United States) is an American racing driver. He competed in the 2012 GP3 Series season for Atech CRS Grand Prix. Ringel is coached by Indy Car driver Jay Howard.

Career
Ringel's kart racing career began in 2008, when he took part in the Rotax Max Challenge USA Junior Max Grand Nationals Presented by Mazda, finishing 29th in only his second karting race . The following year, which was his first full year of karting, Ringel competed in the 2009 Rotax Grand Nationals of the United States and placed 2nd and had the fastest time by 3 tenths, grabbing his first World Finals Ticket . In 2010 in his second and, last full year of karting he once again won a ticket to represent USA in the world finals by winning two tickets . One from the USA nationals and also in the Rotax Pan-Am Championship.

He transferred to auto racing in 2011, taking part in the F2000 Championship Series and various Formula Enterprise races. He took eight wins and broke a track record at Miller Motorsports Park, Tooele, Utah.

Ringel joined the GP3 Series in 2012, with a view to competing in Formula One. He did not score any points over the course of the season, and ended up in 29th in the Drivers' Championship standings.

2013 practice with Formula Atlantic with a full field of 20 FA cars at COTA.  Ethan posted  time 7.7 seconds faster than P2 and 11.4 seconds quicker than last years national champion.

2013 GP3 pre season practice sector times showed Ethan with two quickest sectors but 11th overall . Team Atech sold. Ethan switches to Indy Lights.

2013  TMR, Indy Lights Homestead practice stopped with gear box failure.  St Pete Race gear box issues persisted stopping race before start.

Ringel  is currently unsigned.  Scheduled for Mid Ohio test with Sam Schmidt Motorsports.

Personal life
Ringel's parents are Glenn and Karen. He has two siblings: Alex and Lindy.

Racing record

Career summary

Complete GP3 Series results
(key) (Races in bold indicate pole position) (Races in italics indicate fastest lap)

Indy Lights

Atlantic Championship Series

References

External links

1994 births
Living people
People from Windermere, Florida
Racing drivers from Florida
American GP3 Series drivers
Indy Lights drivers
Atlantic Championship drivers
SCCA National Championship Runoffs participants
Team Moore Racing drivers
Arrow McLaren SP drivers
CRS Racing drivers